The following lists events that happened during 1877 in New Zealand.

Incumbents

Regal and viceregal
Head of State – Queen Victoria
Governor – The Marquess of Normanby

Government and law
The 6th New Zealand Parliament continues.

Speaker of the House – Sir William Fitzherbet
Premier – Harry Atkinson is defeated as Premier on 13 October and is replaced by Sir George Grey
Minister of Finance – When Harry Atkinson is defeated as Premier on 13 October he also loses the position of Treasurer (Minister of Finance). On 15 October William Larnach is chosen as his replacement.
Chief Justice – Hon Sir James Prendergast

Main centre leaders
Mayor of Auckland City – William Hurst followed by Henry Brett
Mayor of Christchurch – Fred Hobbs followed by James Gapes
Mayor of Dunedin – Charles Stephen Reeves followed by Richard Henry Leary
Mayor of Wellington – William Hutchison

Events 
 The Treaty of Waitangi ruled a "simply nullity" in "Wi Parata v the Bishop of Wellington"

Sport

Athletics
The Auckland Amateur Athletic Club is formed.

Cricket
 The Canterbury Cricket Association is formed.
 An England XI under the leadership of James Lillywhite tours in January and February. None of the fixtures were first class, and all the home sides field teams of between 18 and 22 players. The team went on to Australia to play the first ever Test matches. Itinerary

Horse racing
New Zealand Cup winner: Mata
New Zealand Derby winner: Trump Card
Auckland Cup winner: Lara
Wellington Cup winner: Guy Fawkes

see also :Category:Horse races in New Zealand.

Rugby union
 The following rugby clubs were formed: Athletic (Wellington), Waverley, Merivale, Leeston, Southbridge, Rakaia, and Otago University.

Shooting
Ballinger Belt: Lieutenant Paynter (Nelson)

Births
 9 April: Jane Mander, novelist
 18 April Alfred Murdoch, politician.
 18 April:Arthur Stallworthy, politician.
 19 April: George Mitchell, soldier and politician
 ca. October: Te Rangi Hīroa (Peter Buck), Māori leader.
 (in England): Thomas Otto Bishop, politician.
 25 November: Thomas David Burnett, politician.
 4 December: John Christopher Rolleston, politician.

Deaths
 5 January: Sir Donald McLean, politician.
 13 January: Margaret Forbes innkeeper and land protester (born c. 1807)
 15 February: David Monro, politician. 
 8 November: Alfred Ludlam,  politician (born 1810).

See also
List of years in New Zealand
Timeline of New Zealand history
History of New Zealand
Military history of New Zealand
Timeline of the New Zealand environment
Timeline of New Zealand's links with Antarctica

References
General
 Romanos, J. (2001) New Zealand Sporting Records and Lists. Auckland: Hodder Moa Beckett. 
Specific

External links

 
New Zealand